Samuel Kamau Wanjiru (10 November 1986 – 15 May 2011) was a Kenyan long-distance runner who won the 2008 Beijing Olympics Marathon in an Olympic record time of 2:06:32; becoming the first Kenyan to win the Olympic gold in the marathon. He became the youngest gold medallist in the marathon since 1932.

He set the current (as of 2020) 10,000m World Junior Record in 2005 and set the half marathon world record 3 times. In 2009, he won both the London Marathon and Chicago Marathon, running the fastest marathons ever recorded in the United Kingdom and United States, respectively. He retained his Chicago title in 2010 in a season fraught with injury.

In 2011, he died after a fall from a balcony at his home in Nyahururu following a domestic dispute.

Running career

Early career
Wanjiru took his mother's given name as a surname, because she was a single mother. He dropped out of school aged about 12, because they could not afford the school fees.

Wanjiru started running at the age of 8. In 2002, he moved to Japan and went to Sendai Ikuei Gakuen High School in Sendai. He had success on the Japanese cross country circuit, where he won the Fukuoka International Cross Country at sixteen years old in 2003. He went on to win in both Fukuoka and at the Chiba International Cross Country consecutively in 2004 and 2005. After graduating in 2005, he joined the Toyota Kyūshū athletics team, coached by 1992 Olympic marathon silver medalist Koichi Morishita.

Wanjiru had a 5000 m best of 13:12.40, run as a 17-year-old in April 2004 in Hiroshima, Japan. At age 18, Wanjiru broke the half marathon world record on 11 September 2005 in the Rotterdam Half Marathon with a time of 59:16 minutes, officially beating Paul Tergat's half-marathon record of 59:17 minutes.

This was preceded two weeks earlier by a bettering of the 10,000 m world junior record by a margin of almost 23 seconds in the IAAF Golden League Van Damme Memorial Race on 26 August. His WJR time of 26:41.75 was good enough for third place in the race behind Kenenisa Bekele's world record, set in the same race, of 26:17.53 and Boniface Kiprop's 26:39.77. It was Kiprop who held the previous world junior mark (27:04.00 minutes), set at the same meeting the previous year. The run saw 6 runners going under 27 minutes

World records and Olympic gold
Wanjiru took back the half-marathon world record, which Haile Gebrselassie broke in early 2006, with 58:53 minutes on 9 February 2007 at the Ras Al Khaimah Half Marathon and improved it to 58:33 on 17 March 2007 in the City-Pier-City Loop in The Hague, Netherlands. While improving his own record, he recorded an unofficial time of 55:31 for 20 km, which was faster than Haile Gebrselassie's world record but was never ratified due to the timing methods in the race.

Wanjiru made his marathon debut at Fukuoka Marathon on 2 December 2007, winning it impressively with a course record of 2:06:39. He started 2008 by winning the Zayed International Half Marathon and receiving a prize of US$300,000. In the 2008 London Marathon, he came in second, breaking 2:06 for the first time. In the 2008 Summer Olympics, Wanjiru won the marathon gold medal in an Olympic record time of 2:06:32, smashing the previous record of 2:09:21 set by Carlos Lopes of Portugal in the 1984 Olympics. He received the AIMS World Athlete of the Year Award that year in recognition of his performances.

London and Chicago wins
At the Granollers Half Marathon in February 2008, in which Wanjiru won, the Kenyan stated his intent for the future, saying, "in five years' time I feel capable of clocking a sub 2 hours time for the marathon." In April 2009, Wanjiru won the London Marathon in a time of 2:05:10, a new personal record and also a new course record. He was pleased with the achievement and stated that he hoped to break Haile Gebrselassie's world record in the near future. At the Rotterdam Half Marathon, Wanjiru clocked a 1:01:08 on 13 September, which was won by Sammy Kitwara with a time of 58:58. In October 2009, Wanjiru won the Chicago Marathon in a time of 2:05:41, setting a new course record for the city and the fastest marathon time ever run in the United States. The wins in London and Chicago helped him reach the top of the World Marathon Majors rankings for 2009, earning him a jackpot of US$500,000.

He signed up to defend his title at the 2010 London Marathon, but he encountered knee trouble at the midway point of the race and decided to drop out to avoid further injury – the first time in six marathons that he had failed to finish. He chose to run at the 2010 Chicago Marathon in October, but a stomach virus before the race had harmed his preparations and he entered the competition with the lesser aim of reaching the top three. Tsegaye Kebede took the opportunity to forge a lead, but Wanjiru (despite a lack of peak physical form) persevered with the pace and caught up with the Ethiopian. He took the lead in the final 400 m to defend his title in Chicago with a time of 2:06:24. "It was the greatest surprise I have ever seen in my life", remarked his coach, Federico Rosa, on the performance.

Personal life
Wanjiru married Mary Wacera, a fellow long-distance runner, in 2009 and the two had a child (Ann) in 2010. He had previously married Triza Njeri in a traditional ceremony and had two children, although Wanjiru and Wacera's marriage was legally binding.

Wanjiru began drinking alcohol when he moved to Japan, and it increased and became a major part of his life. Despite that, his marathoning career continued successfully, though his personal life became somewhat chaotic.

In December 2010 Wanjiru was arrested by Kenyan police at his house in Nyahururu and charged with threatening to kill his wife and illegally possessing an AK-47 rifle. He denied both the accusations and claimed that he was being framed.

Wanjiru and his wife Triza Njeri, a beautician, had a daughter Anne Wanjiru and a son Simon Njoroge. Wanjiru also had a third wife, Judy Wambui Wairimu, who was pregnant when he died and has since had a son.

Wanjiru's cousin Joseph Riri was a world-class marathon runner, and Wanjiru's younger brother Simon Njoroge was also a long-distance runner.

Death
On 15 May 2011, Wanjiru died from a fall off a balcony at his home in Nyahururu. Wanjiru appeared to have suffered internal injuries after the fall and was confirmed dead by doctors at a nearby hospital after attempts to revive him failed.

Police said Wanjiru's wife, Triza Njeri, had come home to find him in bed with another woman. She locked the couple in the bedroom and ran outside. Wanjiru then died after falling from the balcony. Police are unsure if Wanjiru intended suicide or jumped out of rage, and are investigating the circumstances related to Njeri and his female companion that led to his death.

In May 2017, while testifying during an inquest into Wanjiru's death, his mother Hannah Wanjiru said at the Milimani law court that she believes her son was murdered.

His mother claimed at an inquest into his death that her son was murdered by six men who had conspired with his wife Trizah Njeri. During the inquest at the Milimani court that sought to establish whether Wanjiru was murdered or jumped to his death, a former chief government pathologist said he was convinced that Wanjiru was hit by a blunt object after he had jumped from the balcony of his home, landing on his legs, or possibly he was pushed then struck.

Achievements

Awards
2005 Kenyan Most Promising Sportsman of the Year award.
2008 Kenyan Sportsman of the Year Award.

Personal bests

Most information taken from IAAF profile.

Key: † = World junior record, ‡ = Unofficial

References

External links

Focus on Athletes article from IAAF
Samuel Kamau's Story at Peak Sports Management
Rosa & Associati profile 
Samuel Wanjiru reviews after Rotterdam half marathon
Samuel Wanjiru: End of the Run – slideshow by Life magazine

1986 births
2011 deaths
Kikuyu people
People from Laikipia County
Kenyan male long-distance runners
Kenyan male marathon runners
Chicago Marathon male winners
London Marathon male winners
Olympic athletes of Kenya
Olympic gold medalists for Kenya
Medalists at the 2008 Summer Olympics
Athletes (track and field) at the 2008 Summer Olympics
Kenyan expatriate sportspeople in Japan
Olympic gold medalists in athletics (track and field)
Recipients of the Association of International Marathons and Distance Races Best Marathon Runner Award
Deaths from falls